Bound Skerry is part of the Out Skerries group in the Shetland Islands. As well as being the most easterly island of that group, it is also the  easternmost point of Scotland.

It has a lighthouse on it, which was built in 1857 at a cost of £21,000. Robert Louis Stevenson's family were lighthouse builders, and his signature can be seen in its guestbook. The keepers lived on nearby Grunay.

The island was bombed twice in World War II by the German Luftwaffe, because it was suspected to harbour a munitions factory.

See also

 List of lighthouses in Scotland
 List of Northern Lighthouse Board lighthouses

References

External links
 Northern Lighthouse Board 

Uninhabited islands of Shetland
Skerries of Scotland